Jalal Eddin Omar (Arabic:جلال الدين عمر) (born 13 December 1988) is a Qatari born-Sudanese footballer. He currently plays for Al Bidda as a goalkeeper.

Career
He formerly played for El Jaish, Al-Gharafa, and Al-Markhiya .

External links

References

Living people
1988 births
Qatari footballers
Qatari people of Sudanese descent
Naturalised citizens of Qatar
Sudanese emigrants to Qatar
El Jaish SC players
Al-Gharafa SC players
Al-Markhiya SC players
Al Bidda SC players
Qatar Stars League players
Qatari Second Division players
Association football goalkeepers
Place of birth missing (living people)